David Alexander Caldwell (born May 19, 1987) is an American football safety who is currently a free agent. He played college football at William & Mary.

A native of Montclair, New Jersey, Caldwell graduated from Montclair High School before spending a postgraduate year at the Lawrenceville School.

Professional career

Indianapolis Colts
After going undrafted in the 2010 NFL Draft, Caldwell signed with the Indianapolis Colts as an undrafted free agent on April 30, 2010. He started 13 games at strong safety during the 2011 Regular Season and made 67 tackles.

On August 26, 2012, the Indianapolis Colts waived Caldwell and he is currently an NFL free agent.

On January 8, 2013, Caldwell signed with the New York Giants.

On August 31, 2013, Caldwell did not make the 53-man roster for the Giants, and was waived.

Hamilton Tiger-Cats
On March 28, 2014, he signed with the Hamilton Tiger-Cats.

References

External links
 Hamilton Tiger-Cats bio
 NFL.com profile
 ESPN.com profile

1987 births
Living people
American football safeties
William & Mary Tribe football players
Indianapolis Colts players
Montclair High School (New Jersey) alumni
People from Montclair, New Jersey
Players of American football from New Jersey
Sportspeople from Essex County, New Jersey